Light Bearer may refer to:
Lucifer, called 'Light Bearer', as the Latin word lucifer meant "light-bringing"
Luciferase, a generic term for the class of oxidative enzymes used in bioluminescence
The Light Bearer, a 1994 novel by Donna Gillespie
Phosphorus, etymologically derived from the Greek: φως = light, φέρω = carry, which roughly translates as "light-bringer"
Light Bearers, a Seventh-day Adventist organization co-directed by David Asscherick
Nick Lightbearer, a character from the game We Happy Few
A user of the light, from Destiny (video game series)

See also
Lightbringer (disambiguation)